Rattanheri is a small village situated near Ambala Cantonment in Haryana, India. It forms part of Ambala district.

Location

Governing body 
The village follows the Panchayat Raj system and the panchayat samiti is elected every 5 years. The elections are held under the supervision of local governing bodies.

Other facilities
There is a high school in the village. Two water sources have been set up for the use of the villagers.

See also
Harbon

References

Villages in Ambala district